Vinograd may refer to:

Places 
Vinograd, Bulgaria, a village in Bulgaria
Vinograd, Vologda Oblast, a village in Russia
 , a village in Pale, Bosnia and Herzegovina
Vynohrad (disambiguation), several villages in Ukraine

People 
 David Ostrosky Vinograd (born 1956), Mexican actor
 Jerome Vinograd (1913–1976), American biochemist
 Julia Vinograd (1943-2018), American poet
 Samantha Vinograd (born 1983), American pundit

See also 
 
 Winograd